The 1999–2000 Pro League Football League for the five-year pilot of the Football Association of Thailand. The management team of the tournament in the first 3 years there will be no relegation. The Organising Committee has selected the teams from various sports associations in each sector. 
Northern Region had  Nakhon Sawan, Chiangmai 
North Eastern Region had Sisaket, Udon Thani, Nakhon Ratchasima
Central Region had  Bangkok, Nakhon Pathom, Suphanburi
Southern Region had คือ Satun, Surat Thani,  Pattani, Songkhla

League table

References

Thailand
2
2